Nils Olov Håkan Hagegård (born 25 November 1945) is a Swedish operatic baritone. He also performs lieder and has held academic positions in the United States, Norway, and Sweden.

Early life and education
Born in Karlstad, Hagegård studied at the Royal College of Music, Stockholm and the Mozarteum in Salzburg.

Career
His début as a singer was in 1965, in an open-air performance of Fredrik August Dahlgren's Värmlänningarna at Ransäter. He made his operatic début in 1968 at the Royal Opera in Stockholm as Papageno in Mozart's Die Zauberflöte. The role brought him international acclaim in Ingmar Bergman's 1975 film of the opera. He was attached to the Royal Opera from 1970 to 1978.

He subsequently made his first appearance at the Drottningholm Theatre in 1970, as Pacuvio in Rossini's La Pietra del Paragone, at Glyndebourne in 1973 as the count in Richard Strauss's Capriccio, returning many times to perform works by Strauss and Mozart, and at the Metropolitan Opera in New York in 1978–79 as Malatesta in Donizetti's Don Pasquale. He began his career associated with relatively light roles and expanded his repertore to include Guglielmo in Mozart's Così fan tutte, Count Almaviva in Mozart's Le Nozze di Figaro, Figaro in Rossini's Il Barbiere di Siviglia, Rodrigo  in Verdi's Don Carlos, and Wolfram in Wagner's Tannhäuser. His operatic recordings include Die Zauberflöte, Puccini's La Bohème (as Schaunard), and an operatic recital, and he performed the baritone solos in Robert Shaw's 1980 recording of Orff's Carmina Burana.

He made his début as a lieder singer in Stockholm in 1970, singing Schubert's Die Winterreise and has since given lieder recitals all over Europe. He has premiered song cycles by composers including Dominick Argento and Stephen Paulus.

He has been Senior Lecturer in Music at the Indiana University Bloomington School of Music and was a professor at the Norwegian Academy of Music in Oslo and the first occupant of the Birgit Nilsson chair in singing at the Royal College of Music in Stockholm until 2018, when he resigned his academic positions after accusations of sexual harassment, which he denied.

He established the Hagegården Music Centre, a retreat for performing artists, in the 1990s and the Singers Studio, on the model of the New York Actors Studio, in Stockholm in 2010.

Honours

Hagegård was appointed court vocalist to King Carl XVI Gustaf of Sweden in 1985 and elected to the Royal Swedish Academy of Music in 1989. In 1993 he was awarded the medal Litteris et Artibus.

In 2000, he was awarded an honorary doctorate by Karlstad University.

Personal life
Hagegård was formerly married to the American soprano Barbara Bonney, and has two children. , also an opera singer, is his cousin.

Discography
 Zueignung – Dedication, BIS, 1976
 Puccini: La Bohème, Philips, 1979
 Håkan Hagegård sjunger Olle Adolphson, 1981
 Schubert: Winterreise, RCA, 1983
 Schumann: Liederkreis; Eight songs, RCA, 1986
 Håkan Hagegård Sings Operatic Arias and Swedish Ballads, Caprice Records, 1988
 Mozart: Le nozze di Figaro, L'Oiseau-Lyre, 1988
 Rodgers: The Sound of Music, conducted by Erich Kunzel, Telarc, 1988
 Psalms by Grieg and Mendelssohn, Nimbus, 1989
 Paulus: Songs, Albany Music Distribution, 1990
 Mozart: Don Giovanni, L'Oiseau-Lyre, 1990
 Brahms: Ein Deutsches Requiem, RCA, 1990
 Haydn: The Seasons, Koch International Classics, 1991
 Mahler: Symphony No. 1; Lieder Eines Fahrenden Gesellen, Teldec, 1992
 Ture Rangström: Sånger, Music Svecias, 1993
 Rossini: Il Barbiere di Siviglia, 1993
 Songs, Volume 1 & 2, BMG, 1993
 Wolf: Italienisches Liederbuch, Teldec 1994
 Schubert: Die Schöne Müllerin, RCA Victor Red Seal, 1994
 Orff: Carmina Burana, RCA, 1995
 Zemlinsky: Lyrische Symphonie, 1995
 Strauss: Capriccio, Decca, 1995
 Songs of Brahms, Sibelius and Stenhammar, RCA, 1997
 Faure Requiem, RCA, 1997
 Lucia - En klassisk högtid
 Klassisk Jul, Gazell Productions, 2002
 Edward Grieg: Sigurd Jorsalfar, BIS, 2004
 Mahler: Lieder eines fahrenden Gesellen; Des Knaben Wunderhord; Kindertotenlieder, 2008
 Jul Med Adolf Fredrik, AIS
 Schubert: Schwanengesang, RCA
 Contrasts: Lieder & Folksongs, Proprius-Audiosource

Videography
 Carmen, Role: Zuniga (1973)
 The Magic Flute (1975), Ingmar Bergman, Role: Papageno
 L'Incoronazione di Poppea (1978), Role: Otho
 Cosi fan Tutte (1978), Role: Guglielmo
 Don Pasquale (1979), Role: Dr. Malatesta, Metropolitan Opera, Great Performances at the Met
 Die Fledermaus (1986), Role: Eisenstein, Metropolitan Opera, Great Performances at the Met
 Don Giovanni (1987), Role: Don Giovanni
 Meeting Venus (1991) Role: Wolfram von Eschenbach (highlights)
 The Ghosts of Versailles (1992), Role: Beaumarchais
 Capriccio (1993), Role: The Count
 The Rake's Progress (1995), Role: Nick Shadow
 James Levine's 25th Anniversary Metropolitan Opera Gala (1996), Deutsche Grammophon DVD, B0004602-09
 Die Fledermaus (2003), Role: Falke

References

Swedish operatic baritones
Litteris et Artibus recipients
1945 births
Living people
20th-century Swedish  male opera singers
21st-century Swedish  male opera singers
People from Karlstad